The 1986–87 Florida Gators men's basketball team represented the University of Florida as a member of the Southeastern Conference during the 1986–87 NCAA men's basketball season. Led by head coach Norm Sloan, the team played their home games at the O'Connell Center in Gainesville, Florida. After finishing second in the SEC regular season standings, Florida was bounced in the quarterfinal round of the SEC Tournament by LSU. The Gators received an at-large bid to the NCAA tournament where they made a run to the Sweet Sixteen. In the opening round, Florida defeated NC State and followed that by knocking off No. 3 seed Purdue. The run ended in the East Regional semifinal, where Florida was beaten by eventual National runner-up Syracuse, 87–81. The team finished with a record of 23–11 (12–6 SEC).

Roster

Schedule and results

|-
!colspan=9 style=| Regular season

|-
!colspan=9 style=| SEC Tournament

|-
!colspan=9 style=| NCAA Tournament

Rankings

References

Florida Gators men's basketball seasons
Florida
Florida
Florida Gators
Florida Gators